Geneviève Saumur (born June 23, 1987) is a Canadian Olympic swimmer. She swam for Canada at the 2008 Olympics.

She currently holds the 200-metre freestyle (short-course and long-course) Canadian national record.

She has swum for Canada at:
2010 Pan Pacific Swimming Championships
2009 World Aquatics Championships
2008 Olympics
2007 World Championships
2006 Pan Pacs
2006 Commonwealth Games

She won a silver medal at the 2006 Pan Pacific Swimming Championships as a member of the 4x100-metre freestyle relay team, and a bronze medal in the same event at the 2006 Commonwealth Games.  At the 2008 Summer Olympics, she was a member of the Canadian team that finished in 8th place in the 4x100-metre freestyle relay.

As of 2008, Saumur is studying at Ahuntsic CEGEP.

References

1987 births
Living people
Canadian female freestyle swimmers
French Quebecers
Olympic swimmers of Canada
Swimmers from Montreal
Swimmers at the 2006 Commonwealth Games
Swimmers at the 2008 Summer Olympics
Commonwealth Games medallists in swimming
Commonwealth Games bronze medallists for Canada
Medallists at the 2006 Commonwealth Games